The Adventures of Kid Danger is an American animated comedy television series created by Dan Schneider that aired on Nickelodeon from January 15 to June 14, 2018. The series is based on Henry Danger and details the animated adventures of Kid Danger and Captain Man as they fight various villains and threats to Swellview.

Characters 

 Henry / Kid Danger (voiced by Jace Norman) is the sidekick of Captain Man.
 Ray / Captain Man (voiced by Cooper Barnes) is Swellview's resident superhero.
 Schwoz (voiced by Michael D. Cohen) is an inventor that works for Captain Man and Kid Danger.
 Charlotte (voiced by Riele Downs) is one of Henry's friends.
 Jasper (voiced by Sean Ryan Fox) is one of Henry's friends.
 Piper (voiced by Ella Anderson) is the sister of Henry.
 Mr. Hart (voiced by Jeffrey Nicholas Brown) is the father of Henry and Piper.

Production 
Nickelodeon greenlit the animated series, under the working title The Adventures of Kid Danger and Captain Man, on March 2, 2017, and ordered 10 episodes. The series is executive produced by Dan Schneider. Previous to its television run, it debuted in July 2015 as a Nickelodeon short-form digital series, also created by Schneider.

Broadcast 
The series had a sneak peek of its first two segments as part of Henry Dangers "Toon in for Danger" on January 15, 2018. The Adventures of Kid Danger officially premiered on Nickelodeon on January 19, 2018. In Canada, the series premiered on February 9, 2018, on YTV. In the UK and Ireland, the series premiered on April 9, 2018, also paired with Henry Dangers "Toon in for Danger".

Reception

Critical 
Emily Ashby of Common Sense Media gave the series 2 out of 5 stars; saying that, "Animation suits the utterly ridiculous nature of these characters and their antics slightly better than did the live-action format, but it's still a low-tier pick for kids' viewing. If superheroes are to be judged on their eagerness to leap into action for others' sake, then Captain Man and Kid Danger are hardly worthy of sharing the title with the likes of Spiderman and Wonder Woman. When danger calls, these two are more likely to be found analyzing pieces of popcorn on a whim of looking for twins than they are hot on the trail of a baddie."

Ratings 
 
}}

Episodes

Notes

References

External links 
 
 

2010s American animated television series
2010s American children's comedy television series
2010s Nickelodeon original programming
2018 American television series debuts
2018 American television series endings
American children's animated comedy television series
English-language television shows
Nicktoons
Television series by Schneider's Bakery
Television series created by Dan Schneider